Lime Cay is the main islet off the shore of Port Royal Cays, Jamaica. It located in the northeast region of the reef.

Geography 

Located 15 - 30 minutes by boat from Port Royal. It has a small beach which makes it a popular location for recreation and sunbathing. It is a regular hotspot for post-party-goers, and during holiday season (Summer and Christmas) weekends the island is often swarmed with boats, music and socialites. Lime Cay measures 380 meters northwest-southeast, and is up to 80 meters wide, measuring 2 ha in area. About half of the area is wooded, the rest is sand and coral. It has no infrastructure except for a small open building used as a Gazzebo.

References

Islands of Jamaica